Montacute is a small regional area in the Adelaide Hills, South Australia. Montacute is located on Fifth Creek, and the mostly-rural suburb extends from Rostrevor in the west to Lenswood in the east, bounded on the north by Castambul and on the south by Norton Summit and Cherryville. The small town of Montacute Heights is located on top of the ridge between Fifth and Sixth Creeks. Montacute is reached from Adelaide via Montacute Road.

Copper was discovered in the area in 1843 by Thomas Burr, and a mine was soon set up. One of the mine's financiers, Sir John Baker, named the area after Montacute, Somerset, which was near his birthplace. Gold was discovered in 1846 and the "Victoria Mine" became Australia's first commercially exploited gold deposit.

The main industries are now orchards and market gardens. The 200 hectare Montacute Conservation Park was founded in 1971.

Corkscrew Road, a small road linking Montacute Heights with Gorge Road via a precipitous route with many twists and turns, is a popular route for cyclists and day trippers.

References

Suburbs of Adelaide